is a Japanese voice actress.

Biography
Senbongi studied acting at the Japan Narration Institute. Before graduating, she made her debut as Claire Kokonoe in Chronicles of the Going Home Club. In 2015, she joined I'm Enterprise. She voiced Mumei, the first main heroine in the anime series Kabaneri of the Iron Fortress. She played Chitose Karasuma in Girlish Number. She won the Best Rookie Actresses at the 11th Seiyu Awards. On September 1, 2019, it was selected as in the Saturday personality for the program Hino Midnight Graffiti Run! Kayokyoku from October 2019. On December 29, 2019, her agency announced in a statement that she and fellow voice actor Tasuku Hatanaka have gotten married.

Filmography

Anime series

Film 
Even if the World Will End Tomorrow (2019) as Kotoko
Kabaneri of the Iron Fortress: Unato Decisive Battle (2019) as Mumei
Fate/Grand Order: Camelot - Wandering; Agaterám (2020) as Hassan of Serenity
Eureka - Eureka Seven: Hi-Evolution (2021) as Red 2
Bubble (2022) as Usagi
That Time I Got Reincarnated as a Slime the Movie: Scarlet Bond (2022) as Shuna

ONA
Shinken Zemi Kōkō Kōza's Short Anime "Turnover" (2015) as Ai

Video games
2014
Duel Blake School as Kugutsu Ayatsu, Suzuko Takamaha
Pirates of Fantasia as Veronica
Venus Dungeon as Augustus; Choryo

2015
Brave Sword X Blaze Soul
Thousand Memories as Leonora; Wanda
Twilight Lore as Ariel; Gera; Hawkeye

2016
Fate/Grand Order as Hassan of Serenity
Yome Collection as Mumei

2017
Xenoblade Chronicles 2 as Vale, Mei in Japanese
School Girl/Zombie Hunter as Enami Kamijo
Yuki Yuna is a Hero: Hanayui no Kirameki as Sekka Akihara

2018
Magia Record as Kanagi Izumi
Dragon Star Varnir as Minessa
Crystar as Mirai Hatada

2021
Girls und Panzer: Senshadō Daisakusen! as Emi Nakasuga

2022
Xenoblade Chronicles 3 as Riku
Azur Lane as FFNF Brest
JoJo's Bizarre Adventure: All Star Battle R as Trish Una
Goddess of Victory: Nikke as Eunhwa, Ether

2023
Fire Emblem Engage as Framme
Sword Art Online: Last Recollection  as Lipia

Drama CDs
Shidenkai no Maki (2015), Sachi
Trinity Tempo (2015), Sae Kasuga

Dubbing
All of Us Are Dead (Seo Hyo-ryung (Kim Bo-yoon))
His Dark Materials (Lyra Belacqua (Dafne Keen))
Shazam! (2021 THE CINEMA edition) (Young Thaddeus (Ethan Pugiotto))

References

External links
 Official agency profile 
 

1995 births
Living people
I'm Enterprise voice actors
Japanese video game actresses
Japanese voice actresses
Voice actresses from Saitama Prefecture
21st-century Japanese actresses